Dietrich Gruen (February 22, 1847  April 10, 1911), was a German born watchmaker who emigrated to the United States in the 1860s and later founded the Gruen Watch Company.

Early life and education
Gruen attended public and private schools in Germany. At age 15 he began learning the watchmaking trade. He apprenticed to Hans Martens in Friedburg, Germany and worked in Karlsruhe, Wiesbaden and Lode.

Later life and career
In 1867, at age 20, he immigrated to the United States, following in the steps of his three older brothers, all of whom had immigrated several years before. (One brother had died in 1863 in the American Civil War.)

On his trip to America he met Pauline Wittlinger, the daughter of a watchmaker who lived in Delaware, Ohio. In 1869 Gruen married Wittlinger and moved to Ohio to work for her father. Dietrich's and Pauline's first child, Frederick G. Gruen, was born in 1872; George J. Gruen was born in 1877.

In 1874 Gruen filed a patent for a 'safety' pinion that prevented damage to a pocket-watch movement if the mainspring broke. In 1876 he started the Columbus Watch Manufacturing Company in Columbus, Ohio. In 1882 the company was reorganized as the Columbus Watch Company and moved to a building on Thurman Street. The company now saw itself as in the same ranks of older established American watch companies like Waltham Watch Company and Elgin National Watch Company.

In 1894 Gruen left the Columbus Watch Company, which later bankrupted following the Panic of 1893. That same year Dietrich and his son Frederick founded a new watchmaking company, D. Gruen & Sonlater changed to D. Gruen & Sons when son George joined the firm. By 1898 Gruen and sons had established the Gruen Watch Company in Cincinnati, Ohio.

In 1911 Gruen died suddenly on a business trip as he and his son Fred were nearing the Italian coast on a steamship.

References

External links
 
 

1847 births
1911 deaths
People from Osthofen
People from Rhenish Hesse
German watchmakers (people)
German emigrants to the United States
American company founders
Burials at Spring Grove Cemetery
American watchmakers (people)
19th-century American businesspeople